Sodium thioantimoniate or sodium tetrathioantimonate(V) is an inorganic compound with the formula . The nonahydrate of this chemical, is known as Schlippe's salt, named after Johann Karl Friedrich von Schlippe (1799–1867), These compounds are examples of sulfosalts. They were once of interest as species generated in qualitative inorganic analysis.

Structure

The nonahydrate consists of the tetrahedral tetrathioantimonate(V) anions  and sodium cations , which are hydrated. The Sb-S distance is 2.33 Å. Related salts are known for different cations including ammonium and potassium.

The anhydrous salt is a polymer with tetrahedral Na and Sb sites.

Preparation
Sodium tetrathioantimonate nonahydrate is prepared by the reaction of "antimony trisulfide", elemental sulfur, and aqueous sulfide source.

The Na2S can be  generated in situ by the reaction of sodium hydroxide and S (co-generating sodium sulfate):

Charcoal can also be used to reduce the sulfur.

The required antimony trisulfide is prepared by treatment of Sb(III) compounds with sulfide sources:

Reactions
The hydrate dissolves in water to give the tetrahedral  ion. The salt gives "quinsulfide antimony," upon acidification:

Notes

References
 

Antimony(V) compounds
Sulfides
Sodium compounds
Thiometallates